Tayebi-ye Sarhadi may refer to:
 Tayebi-ye Sarhadi-ye Gharbi Rural District
 Tayebi-ye Sarhadi-ye Sharqi Rural District